Akil Thomas (born January 2, 2000) is a Canadian-American professional ice hockey centre currently playing for the Ontario Reign in the American Hockey League (AHL) as a prospect to the Los Angeles Kings. Prior to the 2018 NHL Entry Draft, Thomas was projected as a top eligible draft pick. He was eventually drafted in the second round, 51st overall, by the Los Angeles Kings.

Thomas began his major junior hockey career with the Niagara IceDogs in 2016. While with the team, Thomas set a new franchise record for regular-season points scored by a rookie and was named their captain. Upon returning from international competition in 2020, he was traded to the Peterborough Petes.

Internationally, Thomas has represented Team Canada at the 2017 IIHF World U18 Championships, 2017 Ivan Hlinka Memorial Tournament, 2018 IIHF World U18 Championships and 2020 World Junior Ice Hockey Championships.

Playing career

Early career
As a youth, Thomas played with the Toronto Marlboros in the GTHL where he scored a team-leading 72 points in 56 games. He then played for the St. Michael's Buzzers in the Ontario Junior Hockey League (OJHL) before being selected 12th overall by the Niagara IceDogs at the 2016 OHL priority draft. While with the Buzzers, Thomas led the team in playoff points with 13 in seven games. He eventually signed a standard player agreement with the IceDogs on June 4, 2016. Prior to being drafted by the Ice Dogs, their head scout
John Neville described him as a mix of Alex Friesen and Nazem Kadri.

Major junior
In his first year of the OHL, during the 2016–17 season, Thomas recorded 48 points in 61 games. He scored his first career OHL point in a 3–1 win over the North Bay Battalion on September 23, 2016. He scored his first career OHL goal in the following game to help lead the IceDogs over the Erie Otters. Thomas earned Rookie of the Month for the month of October honours and set a new franchise record for regular season points scored by a rookie. On April 20, 2017, Thomas was named to the OHL's 2017 All-Rookie team. At the end of the 2016–17 season he finished second overall in OHL rookie of the year voting. Due to his success as a rookie, Thomas was named one of the alternative captains for the IceDogs before the 2017–18 OHL season. He finished the regular season leading the team with 81 points and ended the postseason third in team scoring with 11 points in 10 games.

Leading up to the 2018 NHL Entry Draft, Thomas was considered a first round draft pick, with the final ranking from the NHL Central Scouting Bureau placing Thomas 15th overall for North American skaters. Thomas was eventually drafted in the second round, 51st overall, by the Los Angeles Kings. After the draft, Thomas stated that he would "make every team that didn't draft me regret it, and that's kind of my mentality for the next few months getting ready for the season."

Prior to the 2018–19 season, Thomas was again named an alternate captain for the IceDogs and was invited to the Los Angeles Kings development camp. Upon returning to the OHL for the new season, he earned OHL Player of the Week honours during its opening week after recording five points in an 8–6 win over the Mississauga Steelheads. Shortly thereafter, Thomas recorded another five point night on October 12, in a 7–2 win over the Barrie Colts. As a result of his overall playmaking ability and skill, the Kings signed Thomas to a three-year, entry-level contract on March 16, 2019. At the time of his signing, Thomas ranked ninth in points and tied for fourth in assists. The day after he signed his contract, Thomas recorded his 100th point of the season. Teammate Ben Jones also recorded his 100th point in the same game, making the pair the first teammates to reach 100 points since 2007–08. During the 2018–19 OHL playoffs, Thomas recorded four points in five games to help the IceDogs beat the North Bay Battalion. In the second round, he was similarly effective, recording two points in three games, however, the IceDogs would lose to the Oshawa Generals.

After attending the Kings rookie camp, Thomas was named the IceDogs captain for the 2019–20 season. In his first three games of the season, Thomas recorded three points and eventually tied the team's franchise record for most assists in a game. The new record came while he recorded a new career high of single game assists with a five assist night in an 8–4 win over the Kingston Frontenacs. On October 19, he was named to 2019 CIBC Canada/Russia Series alongside teammate Philip Tomasino and he recorded a goal in their first game against Russia. After returning from the 2020 IIHF World Junior Championship on January 9, 2020, Thomas was traded to the Peterborough Petes in exchange for Cameron Butler and four draft picks. Throughout his major junior career, Thomas wore number 44 on his jersey. Upon arriving to the Petes, Thomas called the brother of the late Steve Montador to ask for permission to wear the number.

Professional 
On September 22, 2020, Thomas was loaned to Eisbären Berlin of the DEL due to the delayed start of the 2020–21 North American season. He returned to the Reign's roster and played on a line with Quinton Byfield and Devante Smith-Pelly, the first all-black line in professional hockey since Herb Carnegie, Ossie Carnegie, and Manny McIntyre in the 1940s. During their first game together, Thomas recorded a natural hat-trick and his line combined for six points in the eventual win.

International play

Thomas holds dual citizenship with Canada and the United States and has chosen to represent Canada internationally. In 2016, Thomas was selected to represent Canada White at the 2016 World U-17 Hockey Challenge in Sault Ste. Marie, ON. He was named an alternate captain as well and scored 3 points in 5 games.

Thomas again represented Canada when he played on Team Canada's under 18 team at the 2017 IIHF World U18 Championships in Slovakia, where Canada placed 5th overall. In the same year, he also represented Canada during the 2017 Ivan Hlinka Memorial Tournament, where he scored 6 points to help Canada win their 21st gold title. After the IceDogs were eliminated from the playoffs, Thomas was selected to play for Team Canada at the 2018 IIHF World U18 Championships. He recorded two points in four games and Canada placed fifth overall in the tournament.

On December 21, Thomas was named to Team Canada's roster for the 2020 World Junior Ice Hockey Championships. He played on the fourth line during the tournament and recorded his only goal in the gold medal round against Russia, the gold medal-winning goal. As a result of his achievement, the Regional Municipality of Niagara deemed January 9, 2020, as "Akil Thomas Day."

Personal life
Thomas's mother is of Barbadian heritage, and his father, Kahlil, is originally from Toronto. His father played hockey with the Toronto Maple Leafs American Hockey League affiliate, the St. John's Maple Leafs. Akil joins his father in the scoring of a championship goal, Kahlil playing for the (then) Memphis RiverKings of the CHL scored the goal which won Memphis the second of two Ray Miron President's Cups in 2002–03. His uncle Leo Thomas also played minor hockey, including some years with the Mississippi RiverKings and Fort Wayne Komets.  In May 2018, his uncle was named head coach of the Macon Mayhem of the Southern Professional Hockey League, becoming the first black head coach for a professional ice hockey team in North America since John Paris Jr. accomplished the feat in the 1990s. Thomas is a dual citizen of the United States and Canada.

Thomas was born in Toronto; however, his family regularly moved around due to his dad's minor hockey career. After his father retired from hockey the family decided to stay in Orlando, Florida, which Thomas lists as his hometown. However, when Thomas was 11 the family decided to move back to Toronto to allow for him to get better hockey-related opportunities. Growing up, Thomas attended St. Michael's College School, where he was advised to skip a grade thus allowing Thomas to enroll in classes at Brock University.

While playing with the Toronto Marlboros, Thomas made a cameo appearance in the film "Soul On Ice: Past, Present & Future," which discusses the history of black players in hockey. His appearance was due to the director, Damon Kwame Mason, being a personal family friend. Thomas also runs a clothing company called Zale Apparel with his friend Ethan Low which embraces his Barbadian heritage.

Career statistics

Regular season and playoffs

International

Awards and honours

Notes

References

External links
 

2000 births
Living people
American men's ice hockey centers
Black Canadian ice hockey players
Canadian ice hockey centres
Canadian people of Barbadian descent
Ice hockey people from Florida
Los Angeles Kings draft picks
Niagara IceDogs players
Ontario Reign (AHL) players
Sportspeople from Orlando, Florida
Ice hockey people from Toronto